Camp Livingston was a U.S. Army military camp during World War II.

History 
Camp Livingston was open from 1940 to 1945, and was first known as Camp Tioga. It was renamed Camp Livingston in honor of Chancellor Robert R. Livingston, a negotiator of the Louisiana Purchase and the brother of Edward Livingston, a US Senator and later the country's Secretary of State. It was home to many divisions (see List, below) and others during the war. In 1941 there was an aviation squadron of 250 African American men in the Army Air Corps performing service functions.

In fall 1941, prior to United States involvement in World War II, the camp was part of the Louisiana Maneuvers, a 400,000-man training exercise involving two imaginary countries fighting each other.

Camp Livingston was designated as a garrison for infantry divisions. The 38th Infantry Division was known as the "Avengers of Bataan" and the 86th Infantry Division  was the first American unit to cross the Danube River in Germany. Over 500,000 troops trained on the  base during the war.  On some old concrete walls in the site, beautiful artwork and graffiti has been discovered and is thought by locals in the area who have personally seen these drawings to have been drawn by Italian, or more likely German POWs - judging by the uniforms depicted in the artwork.  They are very well drawn chalk portraits of what appears to be German soldiers - from the appearance of the uniforms portrayed.

An "Infantry Advanced Replacement Training Center" that provided six weeks of infantry training to men from inactivated antiaircraft and tank destroyer units was active at Camp Livingston from 13 November 1944 until 24 March 1945, when it was converted into a standard infantry replacement training center that gave fifteen weeks of basic infantry training to newly inducted men. After the end of World War II in Europe, in May 1945, the United States Congress passed a law stating that men under the age of nineteen had to have six months of military training before being sent overseas. Around the same time, the seventeen-week basic infantry training program that was in place prior to late December 1944 was restored. As a result, Camp Livingston, along with Camp Gordon, Georgia was re-converted to an Infantry Advanced Replacement Training Center in order to give either nine or eleven weeks of additional training to men under the age of nineteen who were graduates of the interim fifteen-week or restored seventeen-week training programs at the standard infantry replacement training centers.

During World War II, thousands of Japanese, German and Italian  prisoners of war were kept in internment camps at Camp Livingston and Camp Claiborne. In 1942, the United States' first Japanese POW Kazuo Sakamaki arrived at Camp Livingston. Sakamaki was the only surviving crewman of a mini-submarine used in the attack on Pearl Harbor; he was captured by Corporal David Akui after abandoning his sub, which had run aground. The internees at the camps were used to supply logging and farm labor in the area. There was a POW cemetery located within Camp Livingston, and in 1947 the headstones were relocated to Fort Sam Houston, Texas; the bodies of the POWs were left in unmarked graves, where they remain today.

The camp also held between 800 and 1,100 US civilians of Japanese ancestry who were interned as potential fifth columnists after Pearl Harbor. Most of these men remained in confinement throughout the war, despite a lack of evidence to prove they posed a threat to homefront security.

Camp Livingston was deactivated in late 1945 and is now part of the Kisatchie National Forest.

Today
The US Forest Service manages the property where the camp was previously located, and some of the original concrete streets can be accessed as some are used on a daily basis for traffic passing through the camp. The footings from many of the buildings are still in place as well as most of the original parking lots and parade areas. At least two of the swimming pools can be located and one of those up until recent years was used as an unauthorized civilian shooting range. The US Forest Service also maintains the Little Creek and Hickman Trails, which are multiple-use trail systems utilized by ATV enthusiasts throughout the area. The original water treatment plant that was built to serve the camp is still in operation today, and is now operated by Water Works District No. 3 in Rapides Parish.

List of units stationed at Camp Livingston
 28th Infantry Division
 32nd Infantry Division
 38th Infantry Division
 86th Infantry Division
 327th Military Police Escort Guard Company
 93rd Engineer General Service Regiment
 7th Transportation Battalion 
 240th Quartermaster Battalion
 846th Tank Destroyer Battalion
 46th Field Artillery Brigade
 350th Field Artillery Group
 351st Field Artillery Group
 353rd Field Artillery Group
 1692nd Engineer Combat Battalion
 1693rd Engineer Combat Battalion
 1694th Engineer Combat Battalion
 527th Antiaircraft Artillery Automatic Weapons Battalion
 510th Ordnance Heavy Maintenance Company
 106th Cavalry Group

References

External links

 
 Kisatchie National Forest at US Forest Service

Closed installations of the United States Army
Buildings and structures in Grant Parish, Louisiana
Landmarks in Louisiana
Forts in Louisiana
Buildings and structures in Rapides Parish, Louisiana
1940 establishments in Louisiana
1945 disestablishments in Louisiana